Lycée Gustave Eiffel may refer to:

Schools in France:
 Lycée Gustave Eiffel - Bordeaux
 Lycée Gustave Eiffel - Cachan
 Lycée Gustave Eiffel - Dijon
 Lycée Gustave Eiffel (Gagny)
 Lycée Professionnel Gustave Eiffel - Massy
  - Reims
 Lycée Gustave Eiffel - Varennes-sur-Seine

Schools outside France:
 Gustave Eiffel French School of Budapest

See also

 Gustave Eiffel University (est. 2020), Champs-sur-Marne, Marne la Vallée, France
 Eiffel School of Management (est. 2007), Creteil, France
 Eiffel (disambiguation)